The Selangor Masters is a golf tournament on the Asian Development Tour, played in Malaysia. Originally an event on the Asian Tour, the inaugural tournament was held in 2008 at the Seri Selangor Golf Club and the prize fund was US$300,000. Malaysian native Ben Leong won the inaugural tournament. The 2014 prize fund was RM1,300,000.

Winners

Notes

External links
Asian Development Tour's official site

Former Asian Tour events
Golf tournaments in Malaysia
Recurring sporting events established in 2008
2008 establishments in Malaysia